{{DISPLAYTITLE:C5H4N4}}
The molecular formula C5H4N4 may refer to:

 Purine
 Purine analogues
 5-Aza-7-deazapurine
 Pyridine analogues
 Triazolopyridine
 4-azidopyridine

Molecular formulas